Katalin Miskolczi (born 6 August 1976) is a Hungarian former professional tennis player.

Miskolczi had a career singles high ranking of 221 and won two ITF titles, both in 1995. At WTA Tour level, her best performance came when she qualified for the main draw of the 1996 Meta Styrian Open and had a first round win over Anna Smashnova.

ITF finals

Singles: 5 (2–3)

Doubles: 4 (1–3)

References

External links
 
 

1976 births
Living people
Hungarian female tennis players